Kanakkary is a small village in Kottayam district of Kerala state, India. The name Kanakkary is attributed to a lady who frequently visited the village to collect Kanam (revenue tax) in the pre-historic times.

Location
Kanakkary is 72 km south of Kochi and 14 km north of Kottayam. Kanakkary is located 4.4 km from Ettumanoor Mahadeva Temple and near the Vedagiri spinning mill. It is located 8 km from the Mahatma Gandhi University campus and 8 km from St Mary's Forane Church, Kuravilangad.650 metres from new Rajasthan Marbles.

Landmarks
Kanakkary has a famous Lord Krishna temple. Late Rev. Fr. Matthew Karively and his St. Jude's Chapel is on the Kanakkary-Athirampuzha road. Former Sub-Editor of Mangalam daily Adv. Bimal Nair, Late Former Chief Editor of Deepika, Joseph Karively, Malayala Manorama's Chief Photographer Late Victor George are some of the prominent personalities from Kanakkary. Late Mr P.George, (Chengalam George) Puthenparambil one of the  Adventist Writer, who helped to start Kanakkary Seventh-Day Adventist Church since 1960. He wrote several Books and dedicated to all Adventists. Late Sri.K.T Cherian Kattakkayathil Thoranam Vachathil, Retd Assistant Registrar of Co-Operative Societies, Kottayam District was the  Chief Architect behind the formation of the Kanakkari Milk society and Rubber Farmers society, New Rajasthan Marbles Panama jn.

Transportation
The major road passing through Kanakkary is the State Highway 15 (SH 15), also locally known as EE Road or Ettumanur-Ernakulam Road, which links Cochin (Kochi) and Kottayam. Kottayam to Ernakulam railway line also runs through Kanakkary.

Schools
Govt High School Kanakkary which was inaugurated by former Prime Minister Mrs Indira Gandhi boasts the biggest play grounds of the Palai education district. Kanakkary also used to have a famous Chirakulam (pond) which has been ruined since some time. Kanakkary was also known for its CSI Hospital (now closed) and also inaugurated C.S.I Law College (managed by CSI) in hospital Jn: Kanakkary.

Demographics
 India census, Kanakkary had a population of 22360 with 10989 males and 11371 females.

References

Villages in Kottayam district